Kincaid is a village in the Canadian province of Saskatchewan within the Rural Municipality of Pinto Creek No. 75 and Census Division No. 3.

History 
Kincaid incorporated as a village on July 19, 1913.

Demographics 

Climate

Infrastructure

Saskatchewan Transportation Company provided regular intercity bus service to Kincaid, until STC was dissolved in 2017.

Notable people

Ross Belsher, politician and businessman
Pat Donnelly, retired ice hockey winger
Billy Taylor, ice hockey player who played two games for the New York Rangers in the 1964–65 season

See also 

 List of communities in Saskatchewan
 Villages of Saskatchewan

References

Villages in Saskatchewan
Pinto Creek No. 75, Saskatchewan
Division No. 3, Saskatchewan
Populated places established in 1913
1913 establishments in Saskatchewan